The Dafosi Bridge is a cable-stayed bridge spanning  over the Yangtze River in Chongqing, China. The bridge carries 6 lanes of traffic on the G65 Baotou–Maoming Expressway between the Nan'an District east of the Yangtze River and the Jiangbei District to the west.

See also
List of largest cable-stayed bridges
Yangtze River bridges and tunnels

Bridges in Chongqing
Bridges completed in 1997
Road bridges in China
Bridges over the Yangtze River
Cable-stayed bridges in China